The 2023 Ahlsell Nordic Golf Tour is the 38th season of the Swedish Golf Tour, a series of professional golf tournaments for women held in Sweden and neighboring countries.

Most tournaments also feature on the 2023 LET Access Series (LETAS).

Schedule
The season consisted of 7 tournaments played between July and August, where one event was held in Denmark.

See also
2023 Ladies European Tour

References

External links
Official homepage of the Ahlsell Nordic Golf Tour

Swedish Golf Tour (women)
Swedish Golf Tour (women)
2023 in Swedish women's sport